Neshaminy may refer to:

 Neshaminy Mall, a shopping mall in Bensalem, Pennsylvania
 Neshaminy Creek in Bucks County, Pennsylvania
 Neshaminy Falls, Pennsylvania
 Neshaminy Falls (SEPTA station)
 Neshaminy, Pennsylvania, a village of Warrington Township, Bucks County, Pennsylvania
 Neshaminy State Park, a landmark in Bensalem, Pennsylvania
 Neshaminy School District, a school district in Bucks County, Pennsylvania
 Neshaminy High School, a high school in the Neshaminy School District in Langhorne, Pennsylvania
 , a warship built by the U.S. Navy in 1865 but never commissioned or placed in service, renamed Arizona and then Nevada in 1869, sold in 1874